Wilton Simpson (born June 28, 1966) is an American politician who has serves as Florida Commissioner of Agriculture since 2023. From 2012 to 2022, he served as a member of the Florida Senate, representing areas around Citrus, Hernando, and Pasco Counties. He was elected Senate President for the 2020–2022 legislature.

Early life and education
Simpson was born in Lakeland, Florida in 1966. He earned an Associate of Arts degree from Pasco–Hernando State College (formerly Pasco–Hernando Community College) in 1997. Simpson has worked for his family's businesses, Simpson Environmental Services and Simpson Farms.

Political career

Florida Senate
Following the reconfiguration of Florida Senate districts in 2012, Simpson ran in the newly created 18th District, and though he initially anticipated engaging State Representative John Legg in a "very difficult primary," he ended up winning the nomination of the Republican Party and the general election unopposed when Legg decided to run in an adjacent district and his only Democratic opponent, a college student, dropped out.

While serving in the legislature, Simpson was given control by Florida Senate President Don Gaetz over the reform of the Florida Retirement System, and announced that he would either accept the plan proposed by the Florida House of Representatives, which was "a sweeping...plan that would close the FRS pension system to all new employees who become eligible after January 1, 2014," or his own plan, "which would only close the pension plan to senior management and elected officials who become eligible after July 1, 2014. However, on April 30, 2013, the Florida Senate rejected a plan similar to the House proposal, and as the 2013 session closed out, Simpson conceded that there would no reforms for the rest of the year. Simpson had more success, however, with legislation dealing with the restoration of the Everglades, whereby taxes on farmers in the region would be maintained until the 2030s, $880 million would be allocated for water quality restoration, and $32 million would be spent annually on reducing the amount of phosphorus that flows into the region, which was unanimously approved by the legislature.

Simpson's district was reconfigured and renumbered after court-ordered redistricting in 2016.

Simpson has proposed measures that would impose fees and barriers on those who install solar panels on their rooftops. Investigative reporting by the Orlando Sentinel alleged that Florida Power & Light, a dominant Florida utility company that has supposedly sought to hobble the residential solar power industry, ran "ghost" candidates that were intended to help Simpson win re-election by diluting the Democratic vote.

On November 17, 2020, Simpson was elected Senate president for the 2020–2022 legislature.

Candidate for Florida Agriculture Commissioner

In September 2021, Simpson announced he was running for Florida Agriculture Commissioner in the 2022 election cycle. President Donald Trump, 59 Florida Sheriffs, The NRA, Florida Farm Bureau FarmPAC, The Florida Police Benevolent Association, Florida Forestry Association, Florida Chamber of Commerce, The Associated Industries of Florida, Colonel Mike Waltz, Attorney General Ashley Moody and CFO Jimmy Patronis all endorsed Wilton Simpson for Agriculture Commissioner.

References

External links
Florida State Senate – Wilton Simpson
Simpson for Commissioner of Agriculture

|-

|-

|-

|-

1966 births
21st-century American politicians
Florida Commissioners of Agriculture
Republican Party Florida state senators
Living people